Manchester City Football Club, then known as Ardwick, first entered the Football League in the 1892–93 season. Since that time the club's first team has competed in numerous nationally and internationally organised competitions, and all players who have played in 100 or more such matches are listed below, which encompasses all players who have been inducted into the Manchester City Hall of Fame. Also included are all winners of the Player of the Year award, which has been awarded annually since 1967 by the Manchester City Official Supporters Club based on a ballot of the supporters.

Alan Oakes holds the record for Manchester City league appearances, having played 565 matches between 1959 and 1976. If all senior competitions are included, Oakes has 680. 

As of 1 August 2020, the player who has won the most international caps while playing at the club is David Silva with 87 for Spain. Prior to Silva achieving this distinction the record had previously been held by Joe Hart (63 caps) and Colin Bell, the latter of which held the record for over 40 years with 48 England appearances between 1968 and 1975. The current squad member with the most caps is Kevin De Bruyne, who has a total of 96 caps for Belgium, of which 63 have been awarded while a City player. 

The Manchester City player who has been capped the most times for England in total is Frank Lampard, who was capped 106 times for England between October 1999 and June 2014, but he only played for City for one season in 2014–15 after he had retired from international duty. The Manchester City player who has been capped the most times totally internationally is Shay Given, who was capped for the Republic of Ireland 134 times from 1996 to 2016. He played for the club for two and a half seasons between 2009 and 2011.

Sergio Agüero holds the Manchester City goalscoring record across all competitions, and is also the club's highest league goalscorer. These records were set between 2011 and 2021. As of 29 May 2021, Agüero's record stood at 184 league goals scored and 260 overall for City.

Tommy Johnson holds the record for league goals in a single season, with 38 in 1928–29. This single season tally also means Johnson additionally holds the record for most goals scored per game played in a season, his 38 goals in 39 appearances during 1928–29 yielding a goal scoring rate of 0.97 goals per game.

The player who holds the Premier League records for the most lethal scoring rate (i.e., the highest number of goals scored per total minutes played), the most goals for a single club and the most goals for a foreign player, as well as numerous club records, is Sergio Agüero who played for City between 2011 and 2021. During the 2013–14 season, he scored 28 goals from 34 game appearances (or 0.82 goals per game), but since many of his appearances were not full 90 minute games; he actually averaged a goal for roughly every 90 minutes he was on the field, which made him not only the most efficient striker (in terms of minutes per goal) of any club in the Premier League that season — but also in the entire Premier League history.

Sourcing, currency and key for the statistics

The following information applies to both of the tables listed in the next section of this article:

Order
Players are listed according to the date of their first team debut for the club.

Legend
Players listed in bold are inductees of one or more of the following: the Manchester City Hall of Fame, the National Football Museum Hall of Fame, the Scottish Football Museum Hall of Fame, or the Premier League Hall of Fame.
Players listed in italics are winners of the Player of the Year award (and the number of times they have each received this award is shown in the "PotY" column).

Nationality
Normally the player's country of birth or later adopted nationality. In the case of a country such as Germany that has been unified it will indicate whichever of the prior nations, West or East, determined how that player was capped at international level during his playing career despite his nationality now being simply German.

Club career
Club career is defined as the first and last calendar years in which the player appeared for the club in any of the competitions listed below, regardless of how long the player was contracted to the club. For players who had two or more spells at the club, the years for each period are listed separately.

Position
Playing positions are listed according to the tactical formations that were employed at the time. Thus the more defensive emphasis in the responsibilities of many of the old forward and midfield positions, and their corresponding name changes, reflects the tactical evolution that occurred in the sport from the late 1960s onwards. The position listed is that in which the player played most frequently for the club.

The following information applies only to the table of "Historic players" listed in the next section:

Appearances and Goals
Appearances and goals comprise those in the Football League (including test matches and play-offs), Premier League, FA Cup, Football League Cup, UEFA European Cup, UEFA Cup, FA Charity Shield, Associate Members' Cup/Football League Trophy, and several now-defunct competitions — namely the European Cup Winners' Cup, Anglo-Italian Cup, Anglo-Italian League Cup, Texaco Cup, Anglo-Scottish Cup and Full Members' Cup.
Substitute appearances in any of the above included fixtures, and any goals scored as a substitute, are also included.
Appearances or goals scored in testimonial matches, exhibition games, or in any abandoned fixtures, are excluded.
Appearances in the 1939–40 Football League season (abandoned after three games because of the Second World War, and the records for which were expunged from official records), and any other matches played in wartime competitions, are excluded.

Statistics sourcing

All of the Player of the Year data in the table is sourced from the history pages of the Happy to be Blue! web site, which lists all award winners up to, and including, season 2011–12.
All dates and numbers in the table are sourced from a hardcover book published in 2006 according to the inclusion / exclusion rules stated above. The individual table entries of a number of these players have subsequently been sourced from the web wherever possible.
In the case of players whose football careers at Manchester City spanned either of the two world wars, the choice of which appearances, during and either side of the wartime period, are included in the "official" tally of games played may cause discrepancies with other possible sources of similar data for those particular players. Likewise, how competitions such as the Charity Shield, Anglo-Scottish Cup and the Texaco Cup are handled by other sources will also create discrepancies with the numbers included in the table below.

Currency
The statistics are correct as of the beginning of 2004.

The following information applies only to the table of "Contemporary players" listed in the next section:

Appearances and Goals
Appearances and goals are broken out into four column pairs, with the rightmost column pair depicting the respective totals of the appearances and goals shown in the three leftmost column pairs.
The appearances and goals listed under the "League" column pair heading comprise those in the top two tiers of the Football League (including any Football League play-off games) and the Premier League.
The appearances and goals listed under the "Cups" column pair heading comprise only those in the FA Cup and Football League Cup.
The appearances and goals listed under the "Other" column pair heading comprise those in the UEFA Champions League, UEFA Europa League/UEFA Cup, the FA Community Shield, and the Football League Trophy.
Substitute appearances in any of the above included fixtures, and any goals scored as a substitute, are also included.
Appearances or goals scored in testimonial matches, exhibition games, or in any abandoned fixtures, are excluded.

Statistics sourcing
Most of the Player of the Year data in the following table (and elsewhere in this article) is sourced from the history pages of the Happy to be Blue! web site, which lists all award winners up to, and including, season 2011–12. Winners of the PotY award since 2012 are individually cited from elsewhere on the web.
Most of the dates and numbers in the table are sourced from the Soccerbase online database as indicated by the individual cited reference notes for each of the players. The remainder are sourced from Gary James' book.
However, Soccerbase has a few issues. It seems to identify all player appearances and goals scored in Community Shield fixtures on an individual season basis, but does not necessarily include all those appearances in the total appearances tally of certain players. Regardless, the core match data on which those tallies are sometimes mis-totalled is quite sound and accessible in alternative ways, and thus can be used to (self-)correct the database's own tallying errors if properly footnoted.
Goals later reassigned by the Premier League "Dubious Goals Committee" also tend to get overlooked by Soccerbase. Some goals that have never even come before the DGC have been misattributed to other players despite the rest of the football media correctly attributing them. Whatever the source of the discrepancy it can be addressed by footnote reference to alternative match reports for the games in question – which correctly attribute the dubious goal(s) – and by providing links to documentation of the pertinent DGC reassignment findings elsewhere on the web.

Currency
The statistics are correct as of the last match of the 2021-22 season, which was played on 22 May 2022.

List of players
The list of Manchester City players with over 100 appearances, or winners of "Player of the Year" award, is presented below in two tables. The first table lists all the club's historic players, providing only the basic "appearances" and "goals" totals for each of them. The second table groups together the club's most recent players, providing a more detailed breakdown of their "appearances" and "goals" statistics (and with the current players highlighted in blue for easy reference).

Historic players

Contemporary players

Club captains

Most prolific goalscorers 
The players who have scored the most goals in total during their entire club career can be determined by sorting on the appropriate column in either of the above tables. Below is an additional sortable list of the most prolific Manchester City strikers' acumen in front of goal based on their best individual seasons for the club.  Current players are highlighted in blue.

Most England caps
The following is a list of the most capped England internationals to play for Manchester City. The list is initially presented in the chronological order of the dates each player made his debut for England at full international level but can be sorted based on the contents of the fourth column to display the players in order of most appearances for their country. The list includes all ten of the most capped players who played for England while also actively playing for the club (just sort the list instead based on the contents of the third column).  Players who won all of their England caps playing for Manchester City are indicated in bold font. Internationals with no caps won while playing at Manchester City are indicated in italics. Players who are currently internationally active players are highlighted in blue.

* Parenthetical number represents total substitute appearances included in larger total appearances tally for those players for whom substitution is applicable.

Player of the Year awards 
Each season since the end of the 1966–67 season, the members of the Manchester City Official Supporters Club have voted by ballot to choose the player on the team they feel is the most worthy of recognition for his performances during that season.  The following table lists all of the recipients of this award since its inception.  All of these players are listed in italics font in the pair of tables presented in the main section of this article.

Former Manchester City players and managers inducted into Halls of Fame 
A number of former Manchester City players and managers have been inducted into the club's own Hall of Fame (which was inaugurated in 2004) as well as the national football Halls of Fame of both Scotland (also inaugurated in 2004) and England / Wales (inaugurated in 2002).  All of the honoured inductees in one of these three football halls of fame (listed below), who were former players at the club with more than one hundred appearances, are listed in bold font in the pair of tables presented in the main section of this article.

Manchester City Hall of Fame 
The following former Manchester City players and managers are inductees in the Manchester City F.C. Hall of Fame and are listed according to the year of their induction:

National Football Museum Hall of Fame 

The following former Manchester City players and managers are inductees in the English Football Hall of Fame (a.k.a. the National Football Museum Hall of Fame) and are listed according to the year of their induction within the various categories:

Premier League Hall of Fame 
The following players have been inducted into the Premier League Hall of Fame, which is the hall of fame for association football players that have played in the Premier League. Inaugurated in 2020 but delayed a year due to the COVID-19 pandemic, the Hall of Fame is intended to recognise and honour players that have achieved great success and made a significant contribution to the league since its founding in 1992.

Scottish Football Museum Hall of Fame 

The following former Manchester City players and managers are inductees in the Scottish Football Hall of Fame (a.k.a. the Scottish Football Museum Hall of Fame) and are listed according to the year of their induction within the appropriate category:

Welsh Sports Hall of Fame 
The following former Manchester City players and managers are inductees in the Welsh Sports Hall of Fame and are listed according to the year of their induction:

See also
List of Manchester City F.C. players with between 25 and 99 appearances
List of Manchester City F.C. players with fewer than 25 appearances

List of players footnotes

Appearances

Goals

List of players statistics references

Historic players table

Primary table reference

Individual player references

Contemporary players table

Other table references

Most England caps

Most prolific goalscorers

All other references

External links

 

 
Manchester City F.C. players
Players
Association football player non-biographical articles